Assen is a municipality and a city in the Netherlands. It can also refer to:

Surname
 Jan van Assen (1635–1695), Dutch Golden Age painter
 Miguel van Assen (born 1997), Surinamese athlete

Given name
 Assen Blatechki (born 1971), Bulgarian actor
 Assen Bossev (1913–1997), Bulgarian author
 Assen Jordanoff (1896–1967), Bulgarian inventor
 Assen Najdenow (1899–1995), Bulgarian conductor
 Assen Pandov (born 1984), Bulgarian short-track speed skater
 Assen Razcvetnikov (1897–1951), Bulgarian poet

See also
 Asen (disambiguation)
 Asse (disambiguation)
 Assens (disambiguation)